Orthenches disparilis is a moth of the family Plutellidae first described by Alfred Philpott in 1931. It is endemic to New Zealand.

References

Plutellidae
Moths of New Zealand
Moths described in 1931
Endemic fauna of New Zealand
Taxa named by Alfred Philpott
Endemic moths of New Zealand